Barbarofusus barbarensis, common name the Santa Barbara spindle, is an extinct species of sea snail, a marine gastropod mollusk in the family Fasciolariidae, the spindle snails, the tulip snails and their allies.

Description

Distribution
Fossils of this marine species were found in Southern California.

References

 Callomon P. & Snyder M.A. (2017). A new genus and nine new species in the Fasciolariidae (Gastropoda: Buccinoidea) from southern California and western Mexico. Proceedings of the Academy of Natural Sciences of Philadelphia. 165(1): 55-80

barbarensis
Gastropods described in 1855